Philip Shelton Sears (November 12, 1867 – March 10, 1953) was an American tennis player and sculptor.

Early life
He was the son of Frederic Richard Sears and Albertina Homer Shelton. His twin brother was Herbert M. Sears, and older brother Richard Sears, was also a tennis player, and won the US Open singles in its first seven years, from 1881 to 1887, and the doubles for six years from 1882 to 1887, after which he retired from tennis.  He won the NCAA Men's Tennis Championship in 1887 and 1888 while at Harvard University.  He would later graduate from Harvard Law School in 1892.

Tennis career
Sears reached the semifinals of the U.S. National Championships in 1888, and the quarterfinals in 1887. He won the Intercollegiate Championships in 1887 and finished runner-up to Edward L. Hall at the Longwood Tournament in 1891.

Sculptor
He was active as a sculptor in Boston. His work was part of the art competitions at the 1928 Summer Olympics and the 1932 Summer Olympics.

In 2007, the original statue from which the one at Fruitlands Museum was used to create its current life-sized Pumanangwet (He Who Shoots the Stars), sold for $11,250 at Christie's in Beverly Hills; the life-size version, placed in the 1920s and pictured, left, is located at the Fruitlands Museum in Harvard, MA.

Personal life
His son Mason Sears (1899-1973) was a member of the Massachusetts General Court and the chairman of the Massachusetts Republican Party.

References

External links 

1867 births
1953 deaths
American male tennis players
20th-century American sculptors
Tennis people from Massachusetts
Harvard Crimson men's tennis players
Harvard Law School alumni
Olympic competitors in art competitions
19th-century American sculptors
Sculptors from Massachusetts